King-Wai Yau (born October 27, 1948) is a Chinese-born American neuroscientist and Professor of Neuroscience at Johns Hopkins University School of Medicine in Baltimore, Maryland.

Biography 
Born in Guangzhou (formerly called Canton), Guangdong, China, he was the sixth of seven children. His family relocated to Hong Kong within months of his birth. His father, a businessman, died when Yau was only five years old.

He attended secondary school in Buddhist Wong Fung Ling College and St. Paul's Co-educational College in Hong Kong, before entering University of Hong Kong Faculty of Medicine to study medicine. Not wanting to be a physician, however, he departed for the United States in 1968 after only one year of medical study. He received an A.B. in physics (University Scholar; Phi Beta Kappa) from Princeton in 1971 and a Ph.D. in neurobiology from Harvard in 1975, completing his doctoral thesis under John G. Nicholls, a former student of Bernard Katz. He did postdoctoral work with Denis A. Baylor at Stanford University, then with Sir Alan L. Hodgkin at University of Cambridge, United Kingdom. Thereafter, he was on the faculty of University of Texas Medical Branch at Galveston (1981–86), rising to Professor of Physiology and Biophysics in 1985. In 1986, he became Professor of Neuroscience and Investigator of Howard Hughes Medical Institute (1986-2004) at Johns Hopkins University School of Medicine, where he has been since.

Scientific contributions 
He is known for discoveries on how light and odor are sensed in the eye and the nose, triggering neural signals to be transmitted to the brain. He has greatly elucidated the properties of the light responses and their underlying phototransduction mechanisms in retinal rods and cones, as well as in intrinsically-photosensitive retinal ganglion cells which express the photopigment, melanopsin, to mediate mostly non-image vision such as pupillary light reflex and photoentrainment of the circadian rhythm. He has made similarly important discoveries on olfactory transduction in the receptor neurons of the nasal olfactory epithelium. His work impacts broadly on understanding G-protein signaling at a quantitative level. His investigations on the spontaneous activity of rod and cone pigments have provided a physicochemical explanation for why our vision does not extend into Infrared wavelengths.

He is a Member of the National Academy of Sciences and the National Academy of Medicine, and a Fellow of the American Academy of Arts and Sciences, as well as a Member of Academia Sinica, Taiwan.

Selected honors & awards 
 1978, Alfred P. Sloan Foundation Fellow
 1980, Visiting Fellow, Trinity College, Cambridge, United Kingdom
 1980, Rank Prize in Optoelectronics, The Rank Prize Funds, United Kingdom
 1993, Friedenwald Award, Association for Research in Vision and Ophthalmology (ARVO)
 1994, Alcon Award in Vision Research, Alcon Research Institute
 1995, Fellow, American Academy of Arts and Sciences
 1996, Magnes Prize, Hebrew University of Jerusalem
 2004, Teacher of the Year, Johns Hopkins University School of Medicine
 2005, Alcon Award in Vision Research (second time), Alcon Research Institute
 2006, Balazs Prize, International Society for Eye Research (ISER)
 2008, António Champalimaud Vision Award, The Champalimaud Foundation, Portugal
 2010, Member, National Academy of Sciences
 2012, CNIB Chanchlani Global Vision Research Award, Canada
 2013, Alexander Hollaender Award in Biophysics, National Academy of Sciences
 2016, RRF Paul Kayser International Award for Retinal Research (ISER)
 2017, Daniel Nathans Scientific Innovator Award, Johns Hopkins University School of Medicine
 2018, Member, National Academy of Medicine
 2019, Helen Keller Prize for Vision Research, Helen Keller Foundation & BrightFocus Foundation
 2019, Beckman-Argyros Vision Award, Arnold & Mabel Beckman Foundation
 2022, Member, Academia Sinica, Taiwan

Highly-Cited Papers 
Articles with over 500 citations according to Google Scholar  as of May 6, 2017:
1979 "The membrane current of single rod outer segments", 607 citations
1979 "Responses of retinal rods to single photons", 819 citations
1989 "Cyclic GMP-activated conductance of retinal photoreceptor cells", 590 citations
1990 "Primary structure and functional expression of a cyclic nucleotide-activated channel from olfactory neurons", 672 citations
1998 "Identification of ligands for olfactory receptors by functional expression of a receptor library", 534 citations
2002 "Melanopsin-containing retinal ganglion cells: architecture, projections, and intrinsic photosensitivity", 1579 citations
2003 "Melanopsin and rod–cone photoreceptive systems account for all major accessory visual functions in mice", 838 citations
2003 "Diminished pupillary light reflex at high irradiances in melanopsin-knockout mice", 608 citations
2005 "Melanopsin-expressing ganglion cells in primate retina signal colour and irradiance and project to the LGN", 798 citations
2006 "Central projections of melanopsin‐expressing retinal ganglion cells in the mouse", 518 citations

References

External links
Vision Award, Champalimaud Foundation (2008)
Alcon Research Award past recipients (1994, 2005)
Friedenwald Award, ARVO - Association for Research in Vision & Ophthalmology (1993)
Rank Prize in Optoelectronics (1980)
King-Wai Yau laboratory web site

American biophysicists
American neuroscientists
Members of the United States National Academy of Sciences
1948 births
Living people
Howard Hughes Medical Investigators
Harvard Medical School alumni
Princeton University alumni
Physicists from Guangdong
People from Guangzhou
Chinese emigrants to the United States
Chinese neuroscientists
Chinese biophysicists
Alumni of the University of Hong Kong
Hong Kong physicists
Johns Hopkins University faculty
University of Texas Medical Branch faculty
Stanford University alumni
Educators from Guangdong
Biologists from Guangdong
Members of the National Academy of Medicine